Sex, Love & Pain is the third studio album by American R&B singer-songwriter Tank. It was released on May 15, 2007 by Blackground Records and Universal Motown Records. The album debuted at number two on the Billboard 200, selling 103,000 copies in its first week, while reaching number one on Billboards Top R&B/Hip-Hop Albums. Tank's first album to have a Parental Advisory sticker, Sex, Love & Pain was nominated for a Grammy Award for Best R&B Album at the 50th Grammy Awards. Its first single was "Please Don't Go", followed by "Heartbreaker".

Critical reception

AllMusic found that Sex, Love & Pain offers up more smooth urban contemporary grooves tailor-made for deep, soulful seduction. Tank's upbringing in the church is in ample evidence throughout in his impassioned, gospel-infused delivery, but most of the topics on Sex Love & Pain wouldn't pass muster with the local Reverend. The vibe of the album is generally low-key, with bright, keys-heavy arrangements and call-and-response vocals with backup singers (further contributing to the churchified feel), but Tank keeps things intimate with his pleading, flexible tenor and boudoir themes. Fans of Ginuwine, Omarion, and R. Kelly should check this one out."

Track listing

Personnel
Credits for Sex, Love & Pain adapted from Allmusic.

Flent Coleman	 – Executive Producer
Jimmy Douglas	 – Mixing
Sean Garrett	 – Composer
Barry Handerson – Executive Producer
Dawn Haynes	 – Wardrobe
Keri Hilson	 – Composer
Eric D. Jackson – Producer

Harvey Mason, Jr. – Mixing
Aaron Renner	– Assistant Engineer, Mixing
Steve Russell	 – Producer
Dexter Simmons	 – Mixing
Tank	         – Composer, Primary Artist
Timbaland	 – Composer, Guest Artist, Producer
Eric Williams	 – Photography

Charts

Weekly charts

Year-end charts

References

2007 albums
Tank (American singer) albums
Albums produced by Sean Garrett
Albums produced by Timbaland
Albums produced by the Underdogs (production team)